Curtobacterium is a genus of bacteria of the order Actinomycetales. They are Gram-positive soil organisms.

An analysis of Curtobacterium sequences from around the globe revealed the genus to be a cosmopolitan terrestrial taxon, with isolates derived primarily from plant and soil habitat.

References

Microbacteriaceae
Soil biology
Bacteria genera